Maryglade College was a private Roman Catholic college and seminary located in Memphis, Michigan. It opened in 1960 and closed in 1974.

Background
Maryglade College Seminary (Catholic) closed its Memphis, Michigan campus in May 1972. The following year students lived at St. James and later St. Nicholas of Tolentine parishes in the Detroit area, and attended classes at the University of Detroit, a Catholic college run by the Jesuit Fathers. Later they acquired property on Quincy Avenue, just behind the University of Detroit which remains to this day as the Motherhouse of the Pontifical Institute for Foreign Missions (PIME) Fathers and the center for their promotional activities.   

Maryglade College Seminary, which was located at 400 Stoddard Road was under the direction of the PIME Fathers, a missionary society of priests and brothers, and a number of its graduates became priests and missionaries. The founder of the college was Father Nicholas Maestrini, PIME, author of many books on the missions, and regional superior.  He also built seminaries in Newark, Ohio (Sts. Peter and Paul Mission Seminary) and Oakland, New Jersey (Queen of the Missions Seminary). The last rector at the closing of the Memphis Michigan campus was Fr. Carlo Brivio, PIME, a well-known entomologist.  Maryglade was never very large, but the quality of education there was very high under the direction of many extremely talented priests.  It offered one major, viz., Philosophy. Father Lawrence Chiesa PIME, was the head of the department for the greater part of the history of this college seminary.  

The large wooded campus, located on the Belle River, was an ideal and remote location for a seminary.  The building was designed to hold 120 students and a faculty of 15. There was also a convent attached where Sisters ran the domestic department.

Kennedy Angel
The seminary chapel was noted for two works of art. The wall behind the main altar contained a very large mosaic showing the symbols of Matthew (angel), Mark (lion), Luke (ox), and John (eagle). They radiated out from a large crucifix, showing the preaching of the gospel to be a command from Christ. The lower part of the mosaic showed stylized buildings representative of Eastern and Western cultures so as to inspire the students to desire missionary activity around the world.  The mosaic remains to this day in the chapel. (The building is used today as a drug and alcohol rehabilitation center).

The other noteworthy piece of art in the chapel was the so-called "Kennedy Angel." When President John F. Kennedy was in college in 1939, he posed as an angel in a series of carved panels forming an arch.  The series of scenes depicted the life of St. Theresa, the Little Flower.  The work was carved by Irena Wiley, (author of Around the Globe in Twenty Years). This piece of art was removed from the chapel when the seminary closed.

Maryglade was an accredited institution and was also a member of the Consortium of Catholic Colleges in the Detroit area.

References
https://web.archive.org/web/20130812124002/http://www2.westminster-mo.edu/wc_users/homepages/staff/brownr/MichiganCC.htm
http://www.macrao.org/Archives/ClosedColleges.asp

Roman Catholic Archdiocese of Detroit
Defunct private universities and colleges in Michigan
Defunct Catholic universities and colleges in the United States
Educational institutions established in 1960
Educational institutions disestablished in 1972
1960 establishments in Michigan
Catholic universities and colleges in Michigan
1972 disestablishments in Michigan